is a prefecture of Japan located in the Kansai region of Honshu. Nara Prefecture borders Kyoto Prefecture to the north, Osaka Prefecture to the northwest, Wakayama Prefecture to the southwest, and Mie Prefecture to the east.

Nara is the capital and largest city of Nara Prefecture, with other major cities including Kashihara, Ikoma, and Yamatokōriyama. Nara Prefecture is located in the center of the Kii Peninsula on Japan's Pacific Ocean coast, and is one of only eight landlocked prefectures. Nara Prefecture has the distinction of having more UNESCO World Heritage listings than any other prefecture in Japan.

History

Nara Prefecture region is considered one of the oldest regions in Japan, having been in existence for thousands of years, and is widely viewed as the Japanese cradle of civilization. Like Kyoto, Nara was one of Imperial Japan's earliest capital cities. The current form of Nara Prefecture was officially created in 1887 when it became independent of Osaka Prefecture.

Historically, Nara Prefecture was also known as Yamato-no-kuni or Yamato Province.

Up to Nara Period
From the third century to the fourth century, a poorly documented political force existed at the foot of Mount Miwa, east of Nara Basin.  It sought unification of most parts in Japan. Since the historical beginning of Japan, Yamato was its political center.

Ancient capitals of Japan were built on the land of Nara, namely Asuka-kyō, Fujiwara-kyō (694–710) and Heijō-kyō (most of 710–784). The capital cities of Fujiwara and Heijō are believed to have been modeled after Chinese capitals at the time, incorporating grid layout patterns. The royal court also established relations with Sui and then Tang dynasty China and sent students to the Middle Kingdom to learn high civilization. By 7th century, Nara accepted the many immigrants including refugees of Baekje who had escaped from war disturbances of the southern part of the Korean Peninsula. The first high civilization with royal patronage of Buddhism flourished in today's Nara city (710–784 AD).

Nara in the Heian period

In 784, Emperor Kanmu decided to relocate the capital to Nagaoka-kyō in Yamashiro Province, followed by another move in 794 to Heian-kyō,  marking the start of the Heian period. The temples in Nara remained powerful beyond the move of political capital, thus giving Nara a synonym of "Nanto" (meaning "South Capital") as opposed to Heian-kyō, situated in the north. Close to the end of Heian period, Taira no Shigehira, a son of Taira no Kiyomori, was ordered by his father to depress the power of various parties, mainly Kōfuku-ji and Tōdai-ji, who were backing up an opposition group headed by Prince Mochihito. The movement led to a collision between the Taira and the Nara temples in 1180. This clash eventually led to Kōfuku-ji and Tōdai-ji being set on fire, resulting in vast destruction of architectural heritage.

Medieval Nara

At the rise of the Minamoto to its ruling seat and the opening of Kamakura shogunate, Nara enjoyed the support of Minamoto no Yoritomo toward restoration. Kōfuku-ji, being the "home temple" to the Fujiwara since its foundation, not only regained the power it had before but became a de facto regional chief of Yamato Province. With the reconstruction of Kōfuku-ji and Tōdai-ji, a town was growing again near the two temples.

The Nanboku-chō period, starting in 1336, brought more instability to Nara. As Emperor Go-Daigo chose Yoshino as his base, a power struggle arose in Kōfuku-ji with a group supporting the South and another siding the North court. Likewise, local clans were split into two. Kōfuku-ji recovered its control over the province for a short time at the surrender of the South Court in 1392, while the internal power game of the temple itself opened a way for the local samurai clans to spring up and fight with each other, gradually acquiring their own territories, thus diminishing the influence of Kōfuku-ji overall.

The establishment of Nara Prefecture 
A first prefecture (briefly -fu in 1868, but on 15 April 1943, Nara became independent. -ken for most of the time) named Nara was established in the Meiji Restoration in 1868 as successor to the shogunate administration of the shogunate city and shogunate lands in Yamato. After the 1871 Abolition of the han system, Nara was merged with other prefectures (from former han, see List of Han#Yamato Province) and cleared of ex-/enclaves to encompass all of Yamato province. In 1876, Nara was merged into Sakai which in turn became part of Osaka in 1881. In 1887, Nara became independent again. The first prefectural assembly of Nara was elected in the same year and opened its first session in 1888 in the gallery of the main hall of Tōdai temple.

In the 1889 Great Meiji mergers which subdivided all (then 45) prefectures into modern municipalities, Nara prefecture's 16 districts were subdivided into 154 municipalities: 10 towns and 144 villages. The first city in Nara was only established in 1898 when Nara Town from Soekami District was made district-independent to become Nara City (see List of mergers in Nara Prefecture and List of mergers in Osaka Prefecture).

The Sengoku and Edo periods to present

Later, the whole province of Yamato got drawn into the confusion of the Sengoku period. Tōdai-ji was once again set on fire in 1567, when Matsunaga Hisahide, who was later appointed by Oda Nobunaga to the lord of Yamato Province, fought for supremacy against his former master Miyoshi family. Followed by short appointments of Tsutsui Junkei and Toyotomi Hidenaga by Toyotomi Hideyoshi to the lord, the Tokugawa shogunate ultimately ruled the city of Nara directly, and most parts of Yamato province with a few feudal lords allocated at Kōriyama, Takatori and other places. With industry and commerce developing in the 18th century, the economy of the province was incorporated into prosperous Osaka, the commercial capital of Japan at the time.

The economic dependency to Osaka even characterizes today's Nara Prefecture, for many inhabitants commute to Osaka to work or study there.

On 8 July 2022, former Prime Minister Shinzo Abe was assassinated while making a campaign stop for his Liberal Democratic Party in Nara.

Geography

Nara Prefecture is part of the Kansai, or Kinki, region of Japan, and is located in the middle of the Kii Peninsula on the western half of Honshu. Nara Prefecture is landlocked. It is bordered to the west by Wakayama Prefecture and Osaka Prefecture; on the north by Kyoto Prefecture and on the east by Mie Prefecture.

Most of the prefecture is covered by mountains and forests, leaving an inhabitable area of only . The ratio of inhabitable area to total area is 23%, ranked 43rd among the 47 prefectures in Japan.

Nara Prefecture is bisected by the Japan Median Tectonic Line (MTL) running through its territory east to west, along the Yoshino River. On the northern side of the MTL is the so-called Inner Zone, where active faults running north to south are still shaping the landscape. The Ikoma Mountains in the northwest form the border with Osaka Prefecture. The Nara Basin, which lies to the east of these mountains, contains the highest concentration of population in Nara Prefecture. Further east are the Kasagi Mountains, which separate the Basin from the Yamato Highlands.

South of the MTL is the Outer Zone, comprising the Kii Mountains, which occupy about 60% of the land area of the prefecture. The Ōmine Range is in the center of the Kii Mountains, running north to south, with steep valleys on both sides. The tallest mountain in Nara Prefecture, and indeed in the Kansai region, is Mount Hakkyō. To the east, bordering Mie Prefecture, is the Daikō Range, including Mount Ōdaigahara. This mountainous region is also home to a World Heritage Site, the Sacred Sites and Pilgrimage Routes in the Kii Mountain Range".

About 17% of the total land area of the prefecture is designated as National Park land, comprising the Yoshino-Kumano National Park, Kongō-Ikoma-Kisen, Kōya-Ryūjin, Murō-Akame-Aoyama, and Yamato-Aogaki Quasi-National Parks; and the Tsukigase-Kōnoyama, Yata, and Yoshinogawa-Tsuboro Prefectural Natural Parks.

Climate

In the Nara Basin, the climate has inland characteristics, as represented in the bigger temperature variance within the same day, and the difference of summer and winter temperatures. There is not a single year over the last decade (since 1990, up to 2007) with more than 10 days of snowfall recorded by Nara Local Meteorological Observatory.

The climate in the rest of the prefecture are mountainous, and especially in the south, with below  being the extreme minimum in winter. Heavy rainfall is observed in summer.

Spring and fall are temperate. The mountainous region of Yoshino has been popular both historically and presently for its cherry blossoms in the spring. In the fall, the southern mountains are equally striking with the changing of the oak trees.

Cities

There are twelve cities in Nara Prefecture:

Kansai Science City is located in the northwest.

Towns and villages
There are seven districts in Nara, which are further divided into 15 towns and 12 villages as follows:

Mergers

Demographics

According to the 2005 Census of Japan, Nara Prefecture has a population of 1,421,310, which is a decrease of 1.5%, since the year 2000.

The decline continued in 2006, with another decrease of 4,987 people compared to 2005. This includes a natural decrease from previous year of 288 people (11,404 births minus 11,692 deaths) and a decrease due to net domestic migration of 4,627 people outbound from the prefecture, and a decrease of 72 registered foreigners. Net domestic migration has turned into a continuous outbound trend since 1998. The largest destinations of migration in 2005 were the prefectures of Kyoto, Tokyo, and Hyōgo, with respectively a net of 1,130,982 and 451 people moving over. The largest inbound migration was from Niigata Prefecture, contributing to a net increase of 39 people. 13.7% of its population were reported as under 15, 65.9% between 15 and 64, and 20.4% were 65 or older. Females made up approximately 52.5% of the population.

As of 2004, the average density of the prefecture is 387 people per km2. By districts, the so-called Yamato flat inland plain holds as much as about 90% of total population within the approximately 23% size of area in the north-west, including the Nara
Basin, representing a density of 1,531 people per km2. To the contrast, the combined district Gojō and Yoshino District occupies almost 64% of the land, while only 6% of people lives there, resulting in a density of 39 people km2.

Nara prefecture had the highest rate in Japan of people commuting outbound for work, at 30.9% in 2000. A similar tendency is seen in prefectures such as Saitama, Chiba, and Kanagawa, all three of them having over 20% of people commuting for other prefectures.

Politics
 A governor and members of prefectural assembly is elected by citizens in accordance with the Local Autonomy Law.
 Shōgo Arai has been governor since 2007, a former LDP member of the national House of Councillors. In the April 2019 gubernatorial election, he was re-elected to a fourth term with major party support (LDP, DPFP, Kōmeitō) with 47.5% of the vote against former Democratic Diet member and vice-minister Kiyoshige Maekawa (32.3%) and independent physician Minoru Kawashima (20.2%).
 As of 2019, there are 43 seats in the Nara Prefectural Assembly, elected in 16 constituencies (4 single-member, 12 multi-member). After the April 2019 assembly election, the LDP is by far the largest party with 21 members while no other party won more than four seats, but its members are split between several parliamentary groups; by group, the composition as of May 2019 was: LDP 10, LDP Nara 9, Sōsei Nara [of independents] 5, Shinsei Nara [mainly DPFP] 5, JCP 4, Nippon Ishin no Kai 4, Kōmeitō 3,  LDP Kizuna 2.
 There was a clear tendency seen through the results of Lower House election in 2005, that the younger generation executes its voting right much less compared to the older. Only 48.8% of citizens age 20–29 voted, whereas all older generations (grouped by decades) votes more than its younger, reaching the highest voting rate of 86.3% at ages 60–69. The only exception was the 72.1% voting right executed by citizens of 70 or older. The overall average of the prefecture who voted was yet higher, at 70.3%, than that of nationwide average, 67.5%.
 As of October 2019, Nara's directly elected delegation to the National Diet is all-LDP, namely:
 in the House of Representatives where Nara has lost one district in a 2017 reapportionment
 for the 1st district in the North consisting of most of Nara City and Ikoma City: Shigeki Kobayashi (LDP, 2nd term) who narrowly defeated long-time incumbent Sumio Mabuchi in the 2017 House of Representatives election,
 for the 2nd district with southern suburbs (and a small part) of the capital: Sanae Takaichi (LDP, 8th term) who has served as minister in several cabinets and was re-elected with 60% of the vote in 2017,
 for the 3rd district which covers the less urbanized, central and Southern parts of Nara: Taidō Tanose (LDP, 3rd term), member for the now-abolished 4th district before 2017,
 in the House of Councillors where the Nara district is one of the often decisive FPTP single-member districts
 in the 2016–2022 class: Kei Satō (LDP, 1st term) who defeated incumbent Kiyoshige Maekawa in 2016 by a twelve-point-margin in a three-way contest with an Osaka Ishin no Kai challenger,
 in the 2019–2025 class: Iwao Horii (LDP, 2nd term) who defended the seat 55% to 40% against an "independent", joint centre-left (CDP, DPFP, SDP) challenger in 2019.

Economy

The 2004 total gross prefecture product (GPP) for Nara was ¥3.8 trillion, an 0.1% growth over previous year. The per capita income was ¥2.6 million, which is a 1.3% decrease from previous year. The 2004 total gross prefecture product (GPP) for Nara was ¥3.8 trillion, an 0.1% growth over previous year. Manufacturing has the biggest share in the GPP of Nara with 20.2% of share, followed by services (19.1%) and real estates (16.3%). The share of agriculture including forestry and fishery was a mere 1.0%, only above mining, which is quasi-inexistent in Nara.

 Tourism is treated by the prefectural government as one of the most important features of Nara, because of its natural environment and historical significance.
 Nara is famed for its Kaki persimmon. Strawberry and tea are some other popular products of the prefecture, while rice and vegetables, including spinach, tomato, eggplants, and others are the dominant in terms of amount of production.
 Nara is a center for the production of instruments used in conducting traditional Japanese artforms.  Brush and ink (sumi) are the best known products from Nara for calligraphy.  Wooden or bamboo instruments, especially from Takayama area (in Ikoma city) are famous products for tea ceremony.
 Goldfish from Yamatokōriyama in Nara have been a traditional aquacultural product since the 18th century.
 Due to its rich history, Nara is also the location of many archeological digs, with many famous ones being located in the village of Asuka.

Culture

The culture of Nara is tied to the Kansai region in which it is located. However, like each of the other prefectures of Kansai, Nara has unique aspects to its culture, parts of which stem from its long history dating back to the Nara period.

Dialect
There are large differences in dialect between the north/central region of the prefecture, where Nara city is located, and the Okunoya district in the south. The north/central dialect is close to Osaka's dialect, whilst Okunoya's dialect favours a Tokyo-style accent. The lengthening of vowel sounds in the Okunoya dialect is unseen in other dialects of the Kinki region, making it a special feature.

Food culture
Foods particular to Nara Prefecture include:
Narazuke, a method of pickling vegetables
Miwa sōmen, a type of wheat noodle
, a rice porridge made with green tea
, sushi wrapped in persimmon leaves
, rice balls wrapped in pickled takana leaves

Traditional arts
The following are recognized by the Minister of Economy, Trade and Industry as being traditional arts of Nara:
Takayama Tea Whisk (Bamboo item category, recognized in 1975)
Nara Calligraphy Brush (Stationery category, recognized in 1977)

Museums
Nara National Museum
Heijō Palace Museum
Nara Prefectural Museum of Art
Kashihara Archaeological Institute Museum

Education

Universities
Nara Women's University
Nara Medical University
Nara University of Education
Nara University
Nara Prefectural University
Nara Sangyo University (Nara Industrial University)
Nara Institute of Science and Technology
Kio University
Tezukayama University
Tenri University
Hakuhō College

Sports

The sports teams listed below are based in Nara.

Football (Soccer)

Nara Club (Nara)

Basketball
Bambitious Nara (Nara)

Tourism
Many jinja (Shinto shrines), Buddhist temples, and kofun exist in Nara Prefecture, making it is a centre for tourism. Moreover, many world heritage sites, such as the temple Tōdai-ji and Kasuga Shrine, exist in the capital city of Nara.

World Heritage sites

Transportation

Railroad
JR West
Yamatoji Line
Kansai Line
Manyo Mahoroba Line
Wakayama Line
Kintetsu
Nara Line
Keihanna Line
Kyoto Line
Kashihara Line
Ikoma Line
Ikoma Cable Line
Tenri Line
Osaka Line
Tawaramoto Line
Minami Osaka Line
Gose Line
Yoshino Line

Bus

from Nara and Tenri
Shinjuku, Tokyo
Tokyo Station
Yokohama
Tokyo Disneyland in Urayasu
Makuhari, Chiba Prefecture
Nagoya
Osaka International Airport
Kansai International Airport

from Yamato Yagi and Gose
Shinjuku, Tokyo
Shingu
Totsukawa

Road

Expressways and toll roads
Nishi-Meihan Expressway
Meihan Road
Keinawa Expressway
Second Hanna(Osaka-Nara) Road
South Hanna Road

National highways
Route 24
Route 25 (Osaka-Tenri-Nabari-Yokkaichi)
Route 163
Route 165
Route 166
Route 168 (Hirakata-Ikoma-Kashiba-Gojo-Totsukawa-Shingu)
Route 169 (Nara-Tenri-Oyodo-Yoshino-Shingu)
Route 308
Route 309
Route 310
Route 311
Route 368
Route 369
Route 370
Route 371
Route 422
Route 425

Notes

References
 Nussbaum, Louis-Frédéric and Käthe Roth. (2005).  Japan encyclopedia. Cambridge: Harvard University Press. ; OCLC 58053128

External links

 Official Nara Prefecture homepage
 Nara Prefecture All Rights Reserved
 okuyamato.pref.nara 
 Buddhist Monuments in the Horyu-ji Area (UNESCO)
 Historic Monuments of Ancient Nara (UNESCO)
 Sacred Sites and Pilgrimage Routes in the Kii Mountain Range (UNESCO)
 Map of Nara City
 Photos of Nara's temples & shrines
 Nara Tourist Information Center
 Commemorative Events of the 1300th Anniversary of Nara Heijo-kyo Capital
 Comprehensive Database of Archaeological Site Reports in Japan, Nara National Research Institute for Cultural Properties

 
Kansai region
Prefectures of Japan
Tenrikyo